Passport Act of 1920 or Passport Control Act, 1920 was a federal statute authored by the United States 66th Congress. The legislation was an appropriations bill authorizing a fiscal policy for the United States Diplomatic and Consular Service.

The Act of Congress established a fees schedule for identity documents and travel documents as related to United States passports and visés. The public law repealed section one of the Expatriation Act of 1907 discontinuing the issuance of passports to persons not declaring an American citizenship or a renunciation of citizenship in the continental United States.

The United States administrative law petitioned the requisite articles of the Wartime Measure Act of 1918 providing regulatory travel authority for United States foreign departures, domestic entries, and mandatory U.S. passport purposes. The Wartime Measure Act remained in effect through the perils of World War I whereas the United States 66th Congress drafted bill H.R. 9782 efficaciously superseding public law 65-154 by passing the Aliens Restriction Act or public law 66-79 as signed by U.S. President Woodrow Wilson on November 10, 1919.

Clauses of the Act
The Passport Act of 1920 was penned as five sections establishing regulations for the issuance and passport validity of American passports with an inclusion for United States travel visés and work visés.

Passport Control Act - 41 Stat. 750
Expenses of regulating entry into the United States
Fees for Passports and Visés - 41 Stat. 750 § I
Act effective from and after the 1st day of July, 1920
Fees established for application and issue
Retention of fee by State officials
Persons exempted
Alien Passports - 41 Stat. 750-751 § II
Fees for visé and application
Persons exempt
Validity of Passport or Visé - 41 Stat. 751 § III
Validity limited to two years
U.S. Secretary of State by regulation shall limit the passport or visé validity to a shorter period
Foreign Country Refusal to Visé a Passport - 41 Stat. 751 § IV
Return of passport fee if visé refused by foreign officer
Expatriation of Citizens and Their Protection Abroad - 41 Stat. 751 § V
Expatriation Act of 1907 § I
Authority to issue passports to persons not American citizens repealed

Foreign Affairs and U.S. President Woodrow Wilson

See also

References

Bibliography

External links
 
 
 

1920 in American law
1920 in the United States
66th United States Congress
History of immigration to the United States
Federal legislation